Cindrella is a 2016 Sri Lankan romantic film directed by Inoka Sathyangani and produced by Sthree Shakthi Productions. It stars Upeksha Swarnamali and former Sri Lankan ODI cricketer Akalanka Ganegama in lead roles along with Pubudu Chathuranga and Jayani Senanayake. Music composed by Navaratne Gamage. It is the 1243rd Sri Lankan film in the Sinhala cinema. The film contains 17 songs with the help of 7 music directors.

Plot

Chandula and his two friends have planned a holiday at a luxury hotel. On their day of visit, they see a beautiful girl (Isanka) at the hotel and Chandula starts to catch feelings towards her. Chandula's friends don't accept this, but they let him have her his way and keep enjoying the holiday while he tries and gets to know Isanka. Isanka and Chandula get close to each other and their relationship grows really strong within a week. But, due to some reason Isanka doesn't open up her true self to Chandula and disappears after seven days leaving him nothing but a broken heart.

Cast
 Upeksha Swarnamali as Isanka
 Akalanka Ganegama
 Pubudu Chathuranga
 Jayani Senanayake
 Chandrasoma Binduhewa
 Saman Hemaratne
 Indrachapa Liyanage

Soundtrack

References

External links
 ඉනෝකා සත්‍යාංගනී ගේ සින්ඩ්‍රෙල්ලා

2016 films
2010s Sinhala-language films